Buffy the Vampire Slayer is a 1997–2003 supernatural television drama series. 

Buffy the Vampire Slayer may also refer to:

 Buffy the Vampire Slayer (film), a 1992 film that introduced the character Buffy Summers
 Buffy Summers, the protagonist of the Buffy the Vampire Slayer film, TV series, comics, and video games

Publications

 Buffy the Vampire Slayer (BFI TV Classics), a 2005 academic publication relating to the TV series
 Buffy the Vampire Slayer Magazine incorporating Angel Magazine, a magazine title published by Titan Magazines
 Buffy the Vampire Slayer Season Eight, the continuation of the television series, in comic book format
 Buffy the Vampire Slayer Season Nine, the further continuation of the television series, in comic book format
 Buffy the Vampire Slayer Season Ten, the further continuation of the television series, in comic book format
 Buffy the Vampire Slayer Season Eleven, the further continuation of the television series, in comic book format
 Buffy the Vampire Slayer Season Twelve, the further continuation of the television series, in comic book format

Music

 Buffy the Vampire Slayer: The Album, the 1999 TV series soundtrack
 Buffy the Vampire Slayer: Radio Sunnydale – Music from the TV Series, the 2003 TV series second soundtrack album
 Buffy the Vampire Slayer: The Score, a 2008 soundtrack album
 Buffy the Vampire Slayer: Once More, with Feeling, the 2002 soundtrack to the Buffy musical episode of the same name

Games

Buffy the Vampire Slayer (2000 video game), a Game Boy Color video game
Buffy the Vampire Slayer (2002 video game), an Xbox video game
Buffy the Vampire Slayer: Wrath of the Darkhul King, a 2003 Game Boy Advance video game
Buffy the Vampire Slayer: Chaos Bleeds, a 2003 video game
Buffy the Vampire Slayer: The Quest for Oz, a 2004 video game
Buffy the Vampire Slayer: Sacrifice, a 2009 video game for the Nintendo DS
Buffy the Vampire Slayer Collectible Card Game, a 2001 trading card game

See also
 Buffy (disambiguation)
 Vampire Killer (disambiguation)
 Buffy the Vampire Slayer in popular culture
 Buffyverse
 Buffy studies

Buffyverse